Pedro Armendáriz Bohr (April 6, 1940 – December 26, 2011), better known by his stage name Pedro Armendáriz Jr., was a Mexican actor.

Life and career
Pedro Armendáriz Bohr was born in Mexico City to Mexican-American actor Pedro Armendáriz and actress Carmelita Bohr Armendariz.

Armendáriz appeared in the James Bond film, Licence to Kill, as President Hector Lopez. His father Pedro Armendáriz Sr. had been in the earlier James Bond film From Russia with Love. He also appeared in Amistad (1997), The Mask of Zorro (1998), The Mexican (2001), Original Sin (2001), In the Time of the Butterflies (2001), Once Upon a Time in Mexico (2003), And Starring Pancho Villa as Himself (2003), The Legend of Zorro (2005), and Freelancers (2012).

In November 2011, Armendáriz was diagnosed with eye cancer. He died from the disease on December 26, 2011, at age 71, at Memorial Sloan Kettering Cancer Center in New York City. He became the first Mexican actor to be memorialized with the dimming of Broadway's marquee lights that night. His remains were buried at Panteón Jardín in Mexico City, alongside his father.

Filmography

Film

 Fuera de la ley (1966) as Willy
 El Cachorro (1966)
 Los Gavilanes negros (1966)
 El Temerario (1966)
 Matar es fácil (1966) as Gustavo de la Rosa
 Los Tres mosqueteros de Dios (1967) as Manuel
 La Soldadera (1967) as Isidro
 Los Bandidos (1967) as Priest
 Guns for San Sebastian (1968) as Father Lucas
 4 contra el crimen (1969) as Gustavo
 Amor perdoname (1968)
 No hay cruces en el mar (1968) as Sergio
 El Corrido de 'el hijo desobediente' (1968) as Ramiro
 Los Asesinos (1968) as Talbot 
 Las Luchadoras contra el robot asesino (1969)
 El Golfo (1969)
 Todo por nada (1969) as Pedro
 Las Vampiras (1969) as Carlos Mayer
 Los Recuerdos del porvenir(1969) as Capitán Flores
 La Marcha de Zacatecas (1969) as Mayor González
 Super Colt 38 (1969) as Morton
 The Undefeated (1969) as Escalante
 Patsy, mi amor (1969)
 Las Impuras (1969)
 Como enfriar a mi marido (1970)
 The Phantom Gunslinger (1970) as Algernon
 Chisum (1970) as Ben
 Los Juniors (1970) as Rafael Segura Jr.
 Macho Callahan (1970) as Juan
 Su precio... unos dólares (1970) as Sam
 La Belleza (1970)
 River of Gold (1971) as Angel
 Vuelo 701 (1971) as Máximo
 Una Vez, un hombre (1971) as Suarez
 Siete muertes para el texano (1971)
 Primero el dólar (1972)
 Killer by Night (1972) as Carlos Madera 
 Hardcase (1972) as Simon Fergus
 Ni solteros, ni casados (1972)
 Sucedió en Jalisco (1972) as Muñoz
 Trio y cuarteto (1972) (segment "Cuarteto")
 The Magnificent Seven Ride! (1972) as Pepe Carral
 Indio (1972) as Jesse James
 Los Indomables (1972)
 The Soul of Nigger Charley (1973) as Sandoval
 Don't Be Afraid of the Dark (1973) as Francisco Perez
 The Deadly Trackers (1973) as Herrero
 Cinco mil dolares de recompensa (1974) as William Law
 Chosen Survivors (1974) as Luis Cabral
 Las Viboras cambian de piel (1974) as Esposo abandonado
 Traiganlos vivos o muertos (1974) 
 Earthquake (1974) as Emilio Chavez
 Cabalgando a la luna (1974)
 The Log of the Black Pearl (1975) as Archie Hector
 Los Caciques (1975) as Arrieta
 A Home of Our Own (1975) as police captain 
 Más negro que la noche (1975) as Roberto
 Un Mulato llamado Martín (1975)
 Columbo: A Matter of Honor(1976) as Commandante Sanchez
 La Gran Aventura Del Zorro (1976) as Emilio Walter
 El Pacto (1976) as Raul
 La Pasión según Berenice (1976) as Rodrigo Robles
 Longitud de guerra (1976)
 Mina, viento de libertad (1977)
 The Divine Caste (1977) as Abel Ortiz Argumedo
 Carroña (1978) as El Rengo
 La Plaza de Puerto Santo (1978) as Ernesto
 Los Pequeños privilegios (1978) as Pedro
 El Complot mongol (1978) as Filiberto
 El Hijo es mio (1978) 
 Crónica íntima (1979)
 Survival Run (1979) as Paco
 Cadena perpetua (1979) as Javier Lira
 Estas ruinas que ves (1979) as Raymundo Rocafuerte
 El Vuelo de la cigüeña (1979)
 La Ilegal (1979) as Felipe Leyva
 Me olvidé de vivir (1980) as Pedro
 Mamá solita (1980)
 The Dogs of War (1980) as Captain
 Ni solteros, ni cazados (1980)
 Evita Peron (1981) as Cypriano Reyes
 Novia, Esposa y Amante(1981) as Esteban Ampudia 
 La Mujer del ministro (1981) as Inspector Romero
 Rastro de muerte (1981) as Alberto Villamosa
 La Chèvre (1981) as captain
 En el pais de los pies ligeros (1982)
 Dias de combate (1982) as Hector Belascoaran Shayne
 Huevos rancheros (1982)
 Cosa facil (1982) as Hector Belascoaran Shayne 
 El Dia que Murio Pedro Infante (1982) 
 Las Musiqueras (1983) as Alejandro del Río
 Los Dos carnales (1983) as Don Cristóbal
 Chile picante (1983)
 El Corazon de la noche (1984) as Domingo
 La Silla vacia (1984)
 Extraño matrimonio (1984)
 El Billetero (1984)
 Matar o morir (1984) as Tony Collins
 Secuestro sangriento (1985)
 Sangre en el Caribe (1985) as Mario
 Treasure of the Amazon (1985) as Pablo / Zapata
 Historias violentas (1985) (segment 3 "Reflejos")
 Vidas errantes (1985) as El ingeniero
 Treasure Island (1985) as Mendoza
 Maine-Ocean Express (1986) as Pedro De La Moccorra
 Murder in Three Acts (1986) as Mateo
 El Tres de copas (1986)
 El Puente II (1986)
 Persecución en Las Vegas: "Volvere" (1987) as Pagano
 Walker (1987) as Munoz
 Mariana, Mariana (1987) as adult Carlos
 Herencia maldita (1987)
 A Walk on the Moon (1987) as Doctor
 Les Pyramides bleues (1988) as Perez-Valdez
 Lovers, Partners & Spies (1988) as Duke
 El Secreto de Romelia (1988) as Roman
 El Placer de la venganza (1988)
 Diana, René, y El Tíbiri (1988)
 Ke arteko egunak (1989)
 El Costo de la vida (1989)
 Licence to Kill (1989) as President Hector Lopez
 Old Gringo (1989) as Pancho Villa
 La secta del sargon (1990)
 ¡Maten a Chinto! (1990) as Don Chinto
 La Leyenda de una mascara (1991) as López
 Camino largo a Tijuana (1991) as Juan
 Bandidos (1991) as priest
 El Patrullero (1991) as Sargento Barreras
 Diplomatic Immunity (1991) as Oswaldo Delgado
 Corrupción y placer (1991) as Augusto Alarcon 
 Sonata de luna (1992)
 Death and the Compass (1992) as Blot
 Los Años de Greta (1992) as Gustavo
 Extraños caminos (1993)
 Nurses on the Line: The Crash of Flight 7 (1993)
 Tombstone (1993) as priest
 Code... Death: Frontera Sur (1993) as Dragon
 Dos crimenes (1994) as Alfonso
 The Cisco Kid (1994) as General Montano
 Vagabunda (1994) as Pedro Riel
 Novia que te vea (1994)
 Guerrero negro (1994)
 Ámbar (1994) as Commissioner
 Una Luz en la escalera (1994) as Captain Fonseca
 Et Hjørne af paradis (1997) as minister
 De noche vienes, Esmeralda (1997) as Antonio Rossellini
 Reclusorio (1997) as Abogado defensor (segment "Sangre entre mujeres")
 Amistad (1997) as General Espartero
 The Mask of Zorro (1998) as Don Pedro
 Fuera de la ley (1998)
 On the Border (1998) as Herman
 Al borde (1998) as Don Gabino
 La Secta del sargon (1999)
 La Ley de Herodes (1999) as Lopez
 Before Night Falls (2000) as Reynaldo's grandfather
 El Grito (2000) as Duarte
 The Mexican (2001) as Mexican policeman
 Su alteza serenísima (2001) as His most serene highness
 Serafín: La película (2001) as Thinker (voice)
 Original Sin (2001) as Jorge Cortes 
 Asesinato en el Meneo (2001) as Don Manuel
 In the Time of the Butterflies (2001) as captain Peña
 Entre los dioses del desprecio (2001)
 El crimen del padre Amaro (2002) as Presidente Municipal Gordo 
 Once Upon a Time in Mexico (2003) as President of Mexico
 Casa de los Babys (2003) as Ernesto
 And Starring Pancho Villa as Himself (2003) as Don Luis Terrazas
 El Segundo (2004) as El Mayor
 Matando Cabos (2004) as Oscar Cabos
 The Legend of Zorro (2005) as Governor Riley
 Después de la muerte (2005) as Don Julio
 Un mundo maravilloso (2006) as Director del Periódico
 Guadalupe (2006) as Simon
 One Long Night (2007) as Don Ricardo
 El Ultimo justo (2007) as Father del Toro
 Looking for Palladin (2008) as police chief
 Divina confusión (2008) as Melesio
 Navidad S.A. (2008) as Santa Claus
 Nikté (2009) as Kaas (voice)
 Sin memoria (2010) as Benitez
 El baile de San Juan (2010) as Marqués de la Villa
 Mamitas (2011) as Ramon 'Tata' Donicio
 El Cartel de los Sapos (2012) as Don Modesto
 Casa de Mi Padre (2012) as Miguel Ernesto
 Freelancers (2012) as Gabriel Baez
 Desde dentro (2016) as Domingo Altamirano (final film role)

Television

 Honor y orgullo (1969)
 Me llaman Martina Sola (1972)
 Los hermanos coraje (1972)
 Police Story (1973) as Jow Gaitan
 Ven Conmigo (1975) as Eduardo
 Columbo: A Matter of Honor (1976) as Commandante Sanchez
 The Rhinemann Exchange (1977) as Fuentes
 Rosario de amor (1978)
 Julia (1979)
 The Love Boat (1981) as Ricardo
 Remington Steele (1983) as Captain Rios
 Knight Rider (1984) as Eduardo O'Brian
 El Camino Secreto (1986) as Alejandro
 La Gloria y el infierno(1986) as Sebastian Arteaga 
 Airwolf (1986) as Captain Mendez 
 On Wings of Eagles (1986) as Mr. Dobuti
 Un Nuevo amanecer (1988) as Gerardo
 Agujetas de color de rosa (1994) as Aarón
 La Ultima esperanza (1995)
 La Sombra del otro (1996)
 La culpa (1996) as Tomás Mendizábal
 La hora marcada (1988)
 Tony Tijuana (1988) as Tony Tijuana
 Sweating Bullets (1991–1992) as Carillo
 Acapulco H.E.A.T. (1993) as Rodriguez
 Serafín (1999) as Thinker
 Laberintos de pasion (1999) as Padre Mateo Valencia
 Cuento de Navidad (1999)
 Tres mujeres (1999) as Federico Mendez
 Furcio (2000–2002) as Host
 Bajo la misma piel (2003) as Joaquín Vidaurri
 Amy, la niña de la mochila azul (2004) as Matias Granados
 Destilando amor (2007) as Thomas 
 Atrévete a soñar (2009–2010) as Max Williams
 La fuerza del destino (2011) as Anthony McGuire

References

External links

 

1939 births
2011 deaths
Best Actor Ariel Award winners
Deaths from cancer in New York (state)
Deaths from eye cancer
Expatriate male actors in the United States
Male actors from Mexico City
Mexican expatriates in the United States
Mexican male film actors
Mexican male telenovela actors
Mexican male television actors
Mexican people of American descent
Mexican people of German descent